"Whoot, There It Is" is the lead single released from 95 South's debut album, Quad City Knock. It was produced and written by C.C. Lemonhead and Jay Ski (The Bass Mechanics), the production duo who were responsible for several other popular Miami bass acts including the 69 Boyz, Quad City DJs and Dis-n-Dat.

The song preceded the similarly named "Whoomp! (There It Is)" by a month. Though the song didn't reach the level of success of the more popular "Whoomp!", "Whoot, There It Is" became a hit song in its own right, peaking at No. 11 on the Billboard Hot 100 while also receiving a platinum certification from the RIAA for sales of one million copies on July 28, 1993. The following year, an answer song entitled "Whoot, Here It Is" was released by Dis-n-Dat from their debut, Bumpin'. The song was also written and produced by The Bass Mechanics.

Single track listing
"Whoot, There It Is" (Club version)- 6:05
"Whoot, There It Is "(Radio version)- 4:26
"Hump Wit It" (Club Mix)- 6:14
"Whoot, There It Is" (Album version)- 3:05

Charts

Weekly charts

Year-end charts

References

1993 debut singles
1993 songs
Miami bass songs